Kārlis Lasmanis (born 8 April 1994) is a Latvian basketball player for the Latvian 3x3 national team.

He represented Latvia at the 2020 Summer Olympics, sinking the game-winning two-pointer that won Latvia the gold medal. With 76 points, he was the top scorer of the tournament.

His father, Uģis Lasmanis is a former rower who participated in two Olympics, while his sister, Rūta Kate Lasmane is a long jumper and triple jumper.

References

1994 births
Living people
3x3 basketball players at the 2020 Summer Olympics
Centers (basketball)
Latvian men's basketball players
Latvian men's 3x3 basketball players
Medalists at the 2020 Summer Olympics
Olympic gold medalists for Latvia
Olympic medalists in 3x3 basketball
Olympic 3x3 basketball players of Latvia
People from Ventspils